The 23rd Iris Awards ceremony, presented by the newspaper El País, honored the best of radio, television and social networks in Uruguay of 2017 and took place at the Enjoy Hotel & Casino, Punta del Este. It was held on September 01, 2018, and was broadcast by Teledoce, Channel 4 and Channel 10. The ceremony did not have a single host, but different presenters hosted it for a certain time, thus fulfilling a time for the channel that transmitted the event.

During the ceremony, El País presented Iris Awards to television in 14 categories, to radio in 6 and to internet and social networks in 2. It also presented the Golden Iris Award, the Iris for Career, the Special Iris and the Iris of the public.

Winners and nominees

Television

Radio

Internet and Social Networks

Other awards 

Source:

References

External links 

 Iris Awards 2018 website

2018 in Uruguayan television
2018 television awards
2018 television specials
September 2018 events in South America